Arne Enar "Arnie" Sundberg (January 1, 1906 – January 21, 1970) was an American weightlifter who competed in the 1932 Summer Olympics.

He was born in Astoria, Oregon. Married to Ione Markwell, had four kids; Pat, Arnie, Ione and Vilas.

In 1932 he finished fifth in the lightweight class.

External links 
 Profile

1906 births
1970 deaths
American male weightlifters
Olympic weightlifters of the United States
Weightlifters at the 1932 Summer Olympics
People from Astoria, Oregon
Sportspeople from Oregon
20th-century American people